This is a list of civil wars that have occurred in the history of England.
 Rebellion of 1088 – a civil war in England and Normandy concerning the division of lands in the Kingdom of England and the Duchy of Normandy between William Rufus and Robert Curthose two of the sons  of William the Conqueror.
 The Anarchy (1135–1154) – a civil war in England and Normandy between 1135 and 1154 surrounding a succession crisis towards the end of the reign of Henry I.
 Revolt of 1173–1174 – a Kingdom of France-aided rebellion against the royalists of the Angevin Empire.
 Barons' Wars - three separate civil wars led by rebellious barons against the King of England:
 First Barons' War (1215–1217) – a civil war in the Kingdom of England in which a group of rebellious barons, led by Robert Fitzwalter and supported by a French army under the future Louis VIII of France, made war on King John of England.
 Second Barons' War (1264–1267) – a civil war between the forces of a number of barons led by Simon de Montfort against Royalist forces led by Prince Edward (later Edward I of England), in the name of Henry III.
 Despenser War (1321–1322) – a baronial revolt against Edward II instigated by Marcher Lords in opposition to court favourite Hugh Despenser. 
Wars of the Roses (1455–1487) – a series of dynastic civil wars for the throne of England fought between supporters of two rival branches of the royal House of Plantagenet: the House of York and the House of Lancaster.
 The English Civil War (1642–1651) – a series of armed conflicts and political machinations between Parliamentarians ("Roundheads") and Royalists ("Cavaliers") in the Kingdom of England over, principally, the manner of its government.
 First English Civil War (1642–46) – the supporters of King Charles I against the supporters of the Long Parliament
 Second English Civil War (1648–49) – the supporters of King Charles I against the supporters of the Long Parliament
 Third English Civil War (1649–51) – supporters of King Charles II against the supporters of the Rump Parliament

See also

Chronology of the Wars of the Three Kingdoms
 List of wars involving England
 List of wars in Great Britain
English Civil War (disambiguation)
Glorious Revolution
List of civil wars

Civil Wars
English civil wars
Civil wars
United Kingdom military-related lists